James Earl Jones (born January 17, 1931) is an American actor. He has been described as "one of America's most distinguished and versatile" actors for his performances in film, television, and theater, and "one of the greatest actors in American history". Jones's voice has been praised as a "a stirring basso profondo that has lent gravel and gravitas" to his projects, including live-action acting, voice acting, and commercial voice-overs.

Born with a childhood stutter, Jones has said that poetry and acting helped him overcome the disability. A pre-med major in college, he served in the United States Army during the Korean War before pursuing a career in acting. Since his Broadway debut in 1957, he has performed in several Shakespeare plays including Othello, Hamlet, Coriolanus, and King Lear. Jones made his film debut in Stanley Kubrick's 1964 film Dr. Strangelove. Jones worked steadily in theater winning his first Tony Award in 1968 for his role in The Great White Hope, which he reprised in the 1970 film adaptation earning him Academy Award and Golden Globe nominations. He received his second Golden Globe Award nomination for his leading role opposite Diahann Carroll in the 1974 romantic comedy-drama film Claudine. Jones gained international fame for providing the voice of Darth Vader in the Star Wars franchise, beginning with the original 1977 film.

Jones won his second Tony Award in 1987 for his role in August Wilson's Fences. Throughout the 1980s and 1990s, Jones appeared in a number of other successful films, including Conan the Barbarian (1982), Matewan (1987), Coming to America (1988), Field of Dreams (1989), The Hunt for Red October (1990), The Sandlot (1993), and The Lion King (1994). During the 21st century, Jones has continued working in the theater, starring alongside Phylicia Rashad in Cat on a Hot Tin Roof in 2008, and Angela Lansbury in Gore Vidal's The Best Man (2012) on Broadway and in an Australian tour of Driving Miss Daisy (2013). He also appeared in You Can't Take It with You (2014) with Annaleigh Ashford and in The Gin Game (2015–16) alongside Cicely Tyson. Jones has reprised his roles in recent Star Wars media, as well as in The Lion King (2019) and Coming 2 America (2021).

Over his career, Jones has won three Tony Awards (out of five nominations), two Primetime Emmy Awards and a Grammy Award. He was inducted into the American Theater Hall of Fame in 1985. Jones was presented with the National Medal of Arts by President George H. W. Bush in 1992. He received the Kennedy Center Honor in 2002. Jones was invited by President Barack Obama to perform Shakespeare at the White House Evening for Poetry in 2009. That same year he also received the Screen Actors Guild Life Achievement Award. He received an Honorary Academy Award on November 12, 2011. Jones received an Honorary Doctor of Arts degree from Harvard University on May 25, 2017. He was honored with a Special Tony Award for Lifetime Achievement in 2017. On September 12, 2022, the Cort Theatre, a Broadway theater in Manhattan, New York City, was renamed the James Earl Jones Theatre in his honor.

Early life

James Earl Jones was born in Arkabutla, Mississippi, on January 17, 1931, to Ruth (née Connolly); (1911–1986), a teacher and maid, and Robert Earl Jones (1910–2006), a boxer, butler and chauffeur. His father left the family shortly after James Earl's birth and later became a stage and screen actor in New York and Hollywood. Jones and his father did not get to know each other until the 1950s, when they reconciled. He has said in interviews that his parents were both of mixed African-American, Irish and Native American ancestry.

From the age of five, Jones was raised by his maternal grandparents, John Henry and Maggie Connolly, on their farm in Jackson, Michigan; they had moved from Mississippi in the Great Migration. Jones found the transition to living with his grandparents in Michigan traumatic and developed a stutter so severe that he refused to speak. "I was a stutterer. I couldn't talk. So my first year of school was my first mute year, and then those mute years continued until I got to high school." He credits his English teacher, Donald Crouch, who discovered he had a gift for writing poetry, with helping him end his silence. Crouch urged him to challenge his reluctance to speak through reading poetry aloud to the class.

Jones was educated at the Browning School for boys in his high school years and graduated in 1949 as vice president of his class from Dickson Rural Agricultural School (now Brethren High School) in Brethren, Michigan. He attended the University of Michigan, where he was initially a pre-med major. He joined the Reserve Officers' Training Corps and excelled. He felt comfortable within the structure of the military environment and enjoyed the camaraderie of his fellow cadets in the Pershing Rifles Drill Team and Scabbard and Blade Honor Society. During the course of his studies, Jones discovered he was not cut out to be a doctor.

Instead, he focused on drama at the University of Michigan School of Music, Theatre & Dance with the thought of doing something he enjoyed, before, he assumed, he would have to go off to fight in the Korean War. After four years of college, Jones graduated from the university in 1955 with a Bachelor of Arts with a major in drama.

Military service
With the war intensifying in Korea, Jones expected to be deployed as soon as he received his commission as a second lieutenant. As he waited for his orders, he worked as a part-time stage crew hand at the Ramsdell Theatre in Manistee, Michigan, where he had earlier performed. Jones was commissioned in mid-1953, after the Korean War's end, and reported to Fort Benning to attend the Infantry Officers Basic Course. He attended Ranger School and received his Ranger Tab. Jones was assigned to Headquarter and Headquarters Company, 38th Regimental Combat Team. He was initially to report to Fort Leonard Wood, but his unit was instead sent to establish a cold-weather training command at the former Camp Hale near Leadville, Colorado. His battalion became a training unit in the rugged terrain of the Rocky Mountains. Jones was promoted to first lieutenant prior to his discharge.

He moved to New York, where he studied at the American Theatre Wing. He worked as a janitor to support himself.

Career

Early roles
Jones began his acting career at the Ramsdell Theatre in Manistee, Michigan. In 1953, he was a stage carpenter, and between 1955 and 1957 he acted and was a stage manager. In his first acting season at the Ramsdell, he portrayed Othello. His early career also included an appearance in the ABC radio anthology series Theatre-Five. In 1957, he made his Broadway debut as understudy to Lloyd Richards in the short-lived play The Egghead by Molly Kazan. The play ran only 21 performances, however three months later, Jones created the featured role of Edward the butler in Dore Schary's Sunrise at Campobello at the Cort Theatre in January 1958.

1960s

During the early to mid 1960s, Jones acted in various works of William Shakespeare, becoming one of the best known Shakespearean actors of the time. He tackled roles such as Othello and King Lear, Oberon in A Midsummer Night's Dream, Abhorson in Measure for Measure, and Claudius in Hamlet.

Also during this time, Jones made his film debut in Stanley Kubrick's Dr. Strangelove or: How I Learned to Stop Worrying and Love the Bomb (1964) as the young Lt. Lothar Zogg, the B-52 bombardier. Jones would later play a surgeon and Haitian rebel leader in The Comedians, alongside Richard Burton, Elizabeth Taylor and Alec Guinness.

In December 1967, Jones starred alongside Jane Alexander in Howard Sackler's play The Great White Hope at the Arena Stage in Washington D.C. Jones took the role of the talented but troubled boxer "Jack Jefferson," who is based on the real champion Jack Johnson. The play was a huge success when it moved to Broadway on October 3, 1968. The play was well received, winning the Pulitzer Prize for Drama. Jones himself won the 1969 Tony Award for Best Actor in a Play, and the Drama Desk Award for his performance.

In 1969, Jones participated in making test films for the children's education series Sesame Street; these shorts, combined with animated segments, were shown to groups of children to gauge the effectiveness of the then-groundbreaking Sesame Street format. As cited by production notes included in the DVD release Sesame Street: Old School 1969–1974, the short that had the greatest impact with test audiences was one showing bald-headed Jones counting slowly to ten. This and other segments featuring Jones were eventually aired as part of the Sesame Street series itself when it debuted later in 1969 and Jones is often cited as the first celebrity guest on that series, although a segment with Carol Burnett was the first to actually be broadcast. He also appeared on the soap opera Guiding Light.

1970s

In 1973, Jones played Hickey on Broadway at the Circle in the Square Theater in a revival of Eugene O'Neill's The Iceman Cometh. Jones played Lennie on Broadway in the 1974 Brooks Atkinson Theatre production of the adaptation of John Steinbeck's novella, Of Mice and Men, with Kevin Conway as George and Pamela Blair as Curley's Wife. That same year he starred in the title role of William Shakespeare's King Lear opposite Paul Sorvino, René Auberjonois and Raul Julia at the New York City Shakespeare Festival in Central Park.

In 1970, Jones reunited with Jane Alexander in the film adaptation of The Great White Hope. This would be Jones' first leading film role. Jones portrayed boxer Jack Johnson, a role he had previously originated on stage. His performance was acclaimed by critics and earned him an Academy Award nomination for Best Actor. He was the second African-American male performer after Sidney Poitier to be nominated for this award. Variety described his performance declaring, "Jones' re-creation of his stage role is an eye-riveting experience. The towering rages and unrestrained joys of which his character was capable are portrayed larger than life."

In  (1972), Jones starred as a senator who unexpectedly becomes the first African-American president of the United States. The film also starred Martin Balsam and Burgess Meredith.

In 1974, Jones co-starred with Diahann Carroll in the film Claudine, the story of a woman who raises her six children alone after two failed and two "almost" marriages. The film is a romantic comedy and drama, focusing on systemic racial disparities black families face. It was one of the first major films to tackle themes such as welfare, economic inequality, and the typical marriage of men and women in the African American community during the 1970s. Jones and Carroll received widespread critical acclaim and Golden Globe nominations for their performances. Carroll was also nominated for an Academy Award for Best Actress.

In 1977, Jones made his debut in his iconic voiceover role as Darth Vader in George Lucas' space opera blockbuster film Star Wars: A New Hope, which he would reprise for the sequels The Empire Strikes Back (1980) and Return of the Jedi (1983). Darth Vader was portrayed in costume by David Prowse in the film trilogy, with Jones dubbing Vader's dialogue in postproduction because Prowse's strong West Country accent was deemed unsuitable for the role by director George Lucas. At his own request, Jones was uncredited for the release of the first two Star Wars films, though he would be credited for the third film and eventually also for the first film's 1997 "Special Edition" re-release. As he explained in a 2008 interview:

In 1977, Jones also received a Grammy Award for Best Spoken Word Album for Great American Documents.

In late 1979, Jones appeared on the short-lived CBS police drama Paris, which was notable as the first program on which Steven Bochco served as executive producer. Jones also starred that year in the critically acclaimed TV mini-series sequel Roots: The Next Generations as the older version of author Alex Haley.

1980s 
In 1987, Jones starred in August Wilson's play Fences as Troy Maxson, a middle aged working class father who struggles to provide for his family. The play, set in the 1950s, is part of Wilson's ten-part "Pittsburgh Cycle". The play explores the evolving African American experience and examines race relations, among other themes. Jones won widespread critical acclaim, earning himself his second Tony Award for Best Actor in a Play.

Beside the Star Wars sequels, Jones was featured in several other box office hits of the 1980s: the action/fantasy film Conan the Barbarian (1982), the Eddie Murphy comedy Coming to America (1988), and the sports drama/fantasy Field of Dreams (1989) which earned an Academy Award for Best Picture nomination. He also starred in the independent film Matewan (1987). The film dramatized the events of the Battle of Matewan, a coal miners' strike in 1920 in Matewan, a small town in the hills of West Virginia. He received an Independent Spirit Award nomination for his performance.

In 1985, Jones lent his bass voice as Pharaoh in the first episode of Hanna-Barbera's The Greatest Adventure: Stories from the Bible. From 1989 to 1992, Jones served as the host of the children's TV series Long Ago and Far Away.

1990s 

Jones appeared in several more successful films during the early-to-mid 1990s, including The Hunt for Red October (1990), Patriot Games (1992), The Sandlot (1993), Clear and Present Danger (1994), and Cry, the Beloved Country (1995). He also lent his distinctive bass voice to the role of Mufasa in the 1994 Disney animated film The Lion King.

In 1992, Jones was presented with the National Medal of the Arts by President George H. W. Bush.

Jones has the distinction of winning two Primetime Emmys in the same year, in 1991 as Best Actor for his role in Gabriel's Fire and as Best Supporting Actor for his work in Heat Wave.

He has played lead characters on television in three series. The second show aired on ABC between 1990 and 1992, the first season being titled Gabriel's Fire and the second (after a format revision) Pros and Cons. In both formats of that show, Jones played a former policeman wrongly convicted of murder who, upon his release from prison, became a private eye. In 1995, Jones starred in Under One Roof as Neb Langston, a widowed African-American police officer sharing his home in Seattle with his daughter, his married son with his children, and Neb's newly adopted son. The show was a mid-season replacement and lasted only six weeks, but earned him another Emmy nomination. He also portrayed Thad Green on "Mathnet", a parody of Dragnet that appeared in the PBS program Square One Television. In 1998, Jones starred in the widely acclaimed syndicated program An American Moment (created by James R. Kirk and Ninth Wave Productions). Jones took over the role left by Charles Kuralt, upon Kuralt's death.

James has guest starred in many television shows over the years, including for NBC's Law & Order, Frasier, and Will & Grace, and ABC's Lois & Clark: The New Adventures of Superman. In 1990, Jones performed voice work for The Simpsons first "Treehouse of Horror" Halloween special, in which he was the narrator for the Simpsons' version of Edgar Allan Poe's poem "The Raven". He also voiced the Emperor of the Night in Pinocchio and the Emperor of the Night and Ommadon in Flight of Dragons. 

On July 13, 1993, accompanied by the Morgan State University choir, Jones spoke the U.S. National Anthem before the 1993 Major League Baseball All-Star Game in Baltimore. In 1996, he recited the classic baseball poem "Casey at the Bat" with the Cincinnati Pops Orchestra, and in 2007 before a Philadelphia Phillies home game on June 1, 2007.

2000s 
During the 2000s Jones made appearances on various television shows such as CBS's Two and a Half Men, the WB drama Everwood, Fox's medical drama House, M.D., and CBS's The Big Bang Theory.

In 2002, Jones received Kennedy Center Honors at the John F. Kennedy Center in Washington D.C. Also at the ceremony included fellow honorees Paul Simon, Elizabeth Taylor, and Chita Rivera. President George W. Bush joked, "People say that the voice of the president is the most easily recognized voice in America. Well, I'm not going to make that claim in the presence of James Earl Jones." Those there to honor Jones included, Sidney Poitier, Kelsey Grammer, Charles S. Dutton, and Courtney B. Vance.

He also has done the CNN tagline, "This is CNN", as well as "This is CNN International", and the opening for CNN's morning show New Day. Jones was also a longtime spokesman for Bell Atlantic and later Verizon. He also lent his voice to the opening for NBC's coverage of the 2000 and 2004 Summer Olympics; "the Big PI in the Sky" (God) in the computer game Under a Killing Moon; a Claymation film, The Creation; and several other guest spots on The Simpsons. Jones narrated all 27 books of the New Testament in the audiobook James Earl Jones Reads the Bible.

Although uncredited, Jones's voice is possibly heard as Darth Vader at the conclusion of Star Wars: Episode III – Revenge of the Sith (2005). When specifically asked whether he had supplied the voice, possibly from a previous recording, Jones told Newsday: "You'd have to ask Lucas about that. I don't know."

On April 7, 2005, Jones and Leslie Uggams headed the cast in an African-American Broadway revival version of On Golden Pond, directed by Leonard Foglia and produced by Jeffrey Finn. In February 2008, he starred on Broadway as Big Daddy in a limited-run, all-African-American production of Tennessee Williams' Pulitzer Prize-winning drama Cat on a Hot Tin Roof, directed by Debbie Allen and mounted at the Broadhurst Theatre. In November 2009, James reprised the role of Big Daddy in Cat On A Hot Tin Roof at the Novello Theatre in London's West End. This production also stars Sanaa Lathan as Maggie, Phylicia Rashad as Big Mamma, and Adrian Lester as Brick.

In 2009, Jones appeared as a patient in the fourth episode of the sixth season of the medical drama House M.D.

Also in 2009, for his work on film and television, Jones was presented with the Screen Actors Guild Life Achievement Award by Forest Whitaker.

2010s 

 
In October 2010, Jones returned to the Broadway stage in Alfred Uhry's Driving Miss Daisy, along with Vanessa Redgrave at the Golden Theatre.

In November 2011, Jones starred in Driving Miss Daisy in London's West End, and on November 12 received an honorary Oscar in front of the audience at the Wyndham's Theatre, which was presented to him by Ben Kingsley.

In March 2012, Jones played the role of President Art Hockstader in Gore Vidal's The Best Man on Broadway at the Schoenfeld Theatre: he was nominated for a Tony for Best Performance in a Lead Role in a Revival. The play also starred Angela Lansbury, John Larroquette (as candidate William Russell), Candice Bergen, Eric McCormack (as candidate Senator Joseph Cantwell), Jefferson Mays, Michael McKean, and Kerry Butler, with direction by Michael Wilson.

In 2013, Jones starred opposite Vanessa Redgrave in a production of Much Ado About Nothing directed by Mark Rylance at The Old Vic, London.

From February to June 2013, Jones starred alongside Dame Angela Lansbury in an Australian tour of Driving Miss Daisy.

In 2014, Jones starred alongside Annaleigh Ashford as Grandpa in the Broadway revival of You Can't Take It with You at the Longacre Theatre, Broadway. Ashford received a Tony Award nomination for her performance.

On September 23, 2015, Jones opened in a new revival of The Gin Game opposite Cicely Tyson, in the John Golden Theater, where the play had originally premiered (with Hume Cronyn and Jessica Tandy). The play had a planned limited run of 16 weeks. It closed on January 10, 2016.

In 2013–2014, he appeared alongside Malcolm McDowell in a series of commercials for Sprint in which the two recited mundane phone and text-message conversations in a dramatic way. In 2015, Jones starred as the Chief Justice Caleb Thorne in the American drama series Agent X alongside actress Sharon Stone, Jeff Hephner, Jamey Sheridan, and others. The television series was aired by TNT from November 8 to December 27, 2015, running only one season and 10 episodes.

Jones officially reprised his voice role of Darth Vader for the character's appearances in the animated TV series Star Wars Rebels and the live-action film Rogue One: A Star Wars Story (2016), as well as for a brief voice cameo in Star Wars: The Rise of Skywalker (2019).

In 2019, he reprised his voice role of Mufasa for the CGI remake of The Lion King, directed by Jon Favreau, in which he was the only original cast member to do so. According to Favreau, Jones's lines remained mostly the same from the original film. Chiwetel Ejiofor, who voiced Mufasa's evil brother Scar in the remake, said that "the comfort of [Jones reprising his role] is going to be very rewarding in taking [the audience] on this journey again. It's a once-in-a-generation vocal quality."

2020s 
Jones reprised the role of King Jaffe Joffer in Coming 2 America (2021), the sequel to Coming to America (1988). In 2022, his voice was used via Respeecher software for Darth Vader in the Disney+ miniseries Obi-Wan Kenobi. During production, Jones signed a deal with Lucasfilm authorizing archival recordings of his voice to be used in the future to artificially generate the voice of Darth Vader. In September 2022, Jones announced that he would retire from the role of voicing Darth Vader with future voice roles for Vader being created with AI voice software using archive audio of Jones.

Personal life
In 1968, Jones married actress and singer Julienne Marie, whom he met while performing as Othello in 1964. They had no children and divorced in 1972. In 1982, he married actress Cecilia Hart, with whom he had a son, Flynn (born 1982). Hart died from ovarian cancer on October 16, 2016.

In April 2016, Jones spoke publicly for the first time in nearly 20 years about his long-term health challenge with type 2 diabetes. He was diagnosed in the mid-1990s after his doctor noticed he had fallen asleep while exercising at a gym.

Jones is Catholic, having converted during his time in the military.

Filmography
Jones has had an extensive career in film, television, and theater. He started out in film by appearing in the 1964 political satire film Dr. Strangelove as Lt. Lothar Zogg. He then went on to star in the 1970 film The Great White Hope as Jack Jefferson, a role he first played in the Broadway production of the same name.

Jones' television work includes playing Woodrow Paris in the series Paris between 1979 and 1980. He voiced various characters on the animated series The Simpsons in three separate seasons (1990, 1994, 1998).

Jones' theater work includes numerous Broadway plays, including Sunrise at Campobello (1958–1959), Danton's Death (1965), The Iceman Cometh (1973–1974), Of Mice and Men (1974–1975), Othello (1982), On Golden Pond (2005), Cat on a Hot Tin Roof (2008) and You Can't Take It with You (2014–2015).

Awards and honors

While Jones is technically a recipient of the EGOT (Emmy, Grammy, Oscar, Tony), Jones has yet to win a competitive Oscar. In 2011, however, Jones received the Honorary Academy Award presented to him by Ben Kingsley. He has received two Primetime Emmy Awards, two Tony Awards, and a Grammy Award. He also is the recipient of a Golden Globe Award and the Screen Actors Guild Life Achievement Award.

In 1985, Jones was inducted into the American Theater Hall of Fame He was also the 1987 First recipient of the National Association for Hearing and Speech Action's Annie Glenn Award. In 1991, he received the Common Wealth Award for Outstanding Achievement in the Dramatic Arts. In 1992, he was awarded the National Medal of Arts by George H. W. Bush. He received the 1996 Golden Palm Star on the Palm Springs, California, Walk of Stars. Also in 1996, he was given the Golden Plate Award of the American Academy of Achievement presented by Awards Council member George Lucas.
In 2002, he was the featured Martin Luther King Day speaker for Lauderhill, Florida. In 2011, he received the Eugene O'Neill Theater Center Monte Cristo Award Recipient. He was the 2012 Marian Anderson Award Recipient. Jones won the 2014 Voice Icon Award sponsored by Society of Voice Arts and Sciences at the Museum of the Moving Image. In 2017, he received an Honorary Doctor of Arts from Harvard University. In 2019, he was honored as a Disney Legend. In March 2022, Broadway's Cort Theatre was renamed the James Earl Jones Theatre.

References

Further reading
 Ann Hornaday, "James Earl Jones: A Voice for the Ages, Aging Gracefully," Washington Post, September 27, 2014.
 Jones, James Earl, and Penelope Niven. James Earl Jones: Voices and Silences (New York: Charles Scribner's Sons, 1993) 
 Lifetime Honors – National Medal of Arts

External links

 
 
  (archive)
 
 
 
 

1931 births
Living people
20th-century American male actors
21st-century American male actors
Academy Honorary Award recipients
Activists for African-American civil rights
African-American Catholics
African-American male actors
African-American United States Army personnel
American male film actors
American male Shakespearean actors
American male soap opera actors
American male stage actors
American male television actors
American male video game actors
American male voice actors
American people of Irish descent
American people who self-identify as being of Native American descent
Articles containing video clips
Audiobook narrators
Daytime Emmy Award winners
Drama Desk Award winners
Fellows of the American Academy of Arts and Sciences
Grammy Award winners
Kennedy Center honorees
Male actors from Michigan
Male actors from Mississippi
Military personnel from Mississippi
New Star of the Year (Actor) Golden Globe winners
Obie Award recipients
Outstanding Performance by a Lead Actor in a Drama Series Primetime Emmy Award winners
Outstanding Performance by a Supporting Actor in a Miniseries or Movie Primetime Emmy Award winners
People from Manistee County, Michigan
People from Tate County, Mississippi
People with speech impediment
People with type 2 diabetes
Pershing Riflemen
Special Tony Award recipients
Tony Award winners
United States Army officers
United States National Medal of Arts recipients
University of Michigan School of Music, Theatre & Dance alumni